"Run" is a song by American band OneRepublic, taken from their fifth studio album Human. It was released as the fifth single from that album through Interscope Records on May 5, 2021. It was co-written and produced by frontman Ryan Tedder with bassist Brent Kutzle, John Nathaniel and Tyler Spry. A "Latin version" with Mariah Angeliq was released on July 23, followed by two official remixes, Jacaranda remix on July 30 and Collins remix on August 13.

Music video
A music video to accompany the release of "Run" was first released onto YouTube on May 5, 2021.

Charts

Weekly charts

Year-end charts

Certifications

References

2021 singles
2021 songs
OneRepublic songs
Song recordings produced by Ryan Tedder
Songs written by Brent Kutzle
Songs written by Ryan Tedder